Windsor Township is one of the fourteen townships of Lawrence County, Ohio, United States. As of the 2010 census, the population was 2,147.

Geography
Located in the southeastern part of the county, it borders the following townships:
Mason Township - north
Guyan Township, Gallia County - northeast corner
Rome Township - east
Union Township - south
Fayette Township - southwest corner
Lawrence Township - west
Aid Township - northwest corner

No municipalities are located in Windsor Township, although the unincorporated communities of Scottown and Willow Wood are located in the eastern and central parts of the township respectively.

Name and history
Statewide, other Windsor Townships are located in Ashtabula and Morgan counties.

Government
The township is governed by a three-member board of trustees, who are elected in November of odd-numbered years to a four-year term beginning on the following January 1. Two are elected in the year after the presidential election and one is elected in the year before it. There is also an elected township fiscal officer, who serves a four-year term beginning on April 1 of the year after the election, which is held in November of the year before the presidential election. Vacancies in the fiscal officership or on the board of trustees are filled by the remaining trustees.

Current trustees include, Norman R. Humphrey II., Donald Rigney, and Brian Williams.

Fiscal Officer is Hazel Humphrey. Mrs. Humphrey is the first female Fiscal Officer in Windsor Twp.

References

External links
County website

Townships in Lawrence County, Ohio
Townships in Ohio